Kefar Shiḥlayim (also Kfar Shiḥlim, Kfar Shahliim and Kfar Shiḥlaya)(), a place name compounded of the word "Kefar" (village) plus a denominative, was a Jewish town in the Judean lowlands during the Second Temple period. The town is mentioned several times in Hebrew classical literature, viz., the Babylonian Talmud, the Jerusalem Talmud and in Midrash Rabba, and is thought to have been destroyed during the Bar Kochba revolt, alongside the villages of Bish and Dikrin, although later resettled.

Historical background 
In circa 64 CE, when Cestius and his contingent of Roman soldiers were defeated by the people of Jerusalem, this greatly emboldened the war-like faction of Jerusalem who resolved to subdue also the inhabitants of the coastal town of Ascalon, a town inhabited by foreigners and which had a Roman garrison stationed there. The attack made by the advancing soldiers was thwarted by the Roman army and the town's defenders, which, after many of the town's assailants had fallen, those of the Jewish nation who retreated fled with their commander Niger of Perea to a town called Sallis in Idumaea, thought to be Shiḥlayim. There, the few who escaped, recuperated and enlisted other able-bodied men of their fellow countrymen to launch a second attack against Ascalon, but once again failed in their endeavor.

In the early 2nd century, a man from the village appeared before R. Tarfon. A settlement is mentioned by Eusebius from the beginning of the fourth century CE called Saaleim, which he places seven Roman miles (ca. 10 km.) west of Eleutheropolis (Beit Guvrin).

Medieval geographer Yāqūt al-Ḥamawi (Muʿğam 3:46, 49) mentioned "in the territory of ʿAsqelân" a contemporary settlement called Siḥlīn. A locality by this name is also mentioned in a Crusader letter dated 1136 CE. The last clue to the name preservation is the name of the settlement of Menshiyet es-Saḥalin, documented in the Ottoman Census of 1596, which probably refers to the former town Iraq al-Manshiyya in present-day Kiryat Gat.

Talmudic references
The Babylonian Talmud (redacted in 500 CE) refers to three cities with populations greater than those who departed Egypt, thought to be hyperbolic speech:
Rabbi Assi said King Alexander Jannaeus (Yannai) had six-hundred thousand townships on the King's Mountain and each one having the equivalent in numbers of those departing Egypt, except three which had double the number of those departing Egypt: Kefar Bish, Kefar Shiḥlayim, and Kefar Dikraya. Kefar Bish (lit. "Evil Village") was so-called because they would not give lodging to strangers. Kefar Shiḥlayim (lit. "Garden Cress Village") was so-called because they made their living by cultivating garden cress. As for Kefar Dikraya (lit. "Village of Males"), Rabbi Yochanan said that it was so-called because the women of the village were prolific in giving birth to male children first, and, afterwards, females.

The account in the Jerusalem Talmud, likewise, mentions a population double that of the Israelites who left Egypt, a characteristically exaggerated number in the Talmud, but also differs slightly:

There were three villages, each one having a population twice the number of the Israelites who departed Egypt: Kefar Bish, Kefar Shiḥlaya, and Kefar Dikraya. Why is it that they call it Kefar Bish? It is because they would not show hospitality to wayfarers. And why is it that they call it Kefar Shiḥlaya? It is because they were prolific in their child-bearing, just as those [who cultivate] garden-cress. And why is it that they call it Dikraya? It is because all of their women would give birth to male children. Unless one of them went out from there, they could not give birth to a female.

Etymology
The origin of the name of the settlement Kefar Shiḥlayim is explained in the Jerusalem Talmud as being because they were prolific in child-bearing, just as garden-cress (Aramaic: taḥlūsiya) grows profusely when cultivated. The Aramaic word is equivalent to the Mishnaic Hebrew word for the same, being shiḥlayim. In the Babylonian Talmud the name of the settlement is attributed to the fact that the inhabitants of that place subsisted on the traffic of cress. When these traditions were narrated in the 3rd-century CE, these places were thought to already be in ruins.

The same rendering is had when transliterating the Hebrew Shihlayim into Greek, and which in English has been rendered as Sallis in Josephus' The Jewish War (3.2.2.), and Saaleim in Eusebius' Onomasticon (160:9–10). Israeli historical geography, Yoel Elitzur, noting the same phonetic factors, wrote that place names bearing the Hebrew glottal consonants /h/ are not known in surviving names from the Onomasticon. Hebrew names such as Pella =  and Sallis (Saaleim) =  are always transcribed by Greek writers in a geminative form, rather than in a guttural.

Thomsen and Nestle conclude that the Sallis mentioned by Josephus is identical with the Saaleim of Eusebius. Similarly, Schlatter identifies Kefar Shiḥlayim of the Talmud with Sallis of Josephus. Neubauer, throwing further light on the subject, suggests that the identification of Kefar Shiḥlayim, found in the Talmud and midrashic literature, be recognized in the name Shilḥim of the Bible.

According to others, the Palestinian toponym Sihlin represents a complex linguistic tradition, characteristic of other place-names in Idumea and which toponymy show by their evolution a Judaean Hebrew substratum, followed by an Arabo-Edomite superstratum presumably not devoid of an Aramaic adstratum.

Identification 

Several sites have been proposed for the ancient Kefar Shiḥlayim. Josephus places Sallis (Chaallis) in Idumaea, a geographical region of ancient Palestine directly south-southwest of Jerusalem.

Iraq al-Manshiyya 
()

The chief proponents of this theory being historical geographers Peter Thomsen, Samuel Klein and Paul Romanoff. Samuel Klein went so far as to note that in extant Greek texts of Josephus' The Jewish War (3.2.2.) there are found two versions of the Greek transliterated name "Sallis," the one being  = Chaallis, and the other being  = Sallis. Klein then conflates the two renditions of the same place-name to come up with  = Kefar Shiḥlayim, and which Klein says was called by Eusebius and other Arab authors by the name Saḥalin. Yoel Elitzur followed in Klein's footsteps, proposing the same location for the village, based on the similar Arabic name preserved in the 1596 Ottoman tax registers.

According to Press, the adjacent Tell known as Tel ʽErani (Tell esh-Sheikh el-ʽAreini) bore the old name of ʽIraq el-Menšiye during the Mamluk and Ottoman period, a name that was only later applied to the Arab village at the foot of the Tell.

Khirbet Shaḥleh 
Yeshayahu Press, chief editor of Topographical-Historical Encyclopedia of the Land of Israel, proposed that the town Kefar Shiḥlayim lay within the confines of the ruin Khirbet Shaḥleh (Kh. Šaḥleh), now Ḥórvat Šēlaḥ, a ruin located almost 2 statute miles to the east of Iraq al-Manshiyya, and called Khŭrbet Shalkhah (grid position 131113 PAL) in the British Survey of Western Palestine map (III, 285). F.M. Abel and Israeli archaeologist, Avi-Yonah, mention this site under the name Šalḫa. A.F. Rainey and Israeli archaeologist Yoram Tsafrir are major proponents of this theory.

Sahlim 
Klein, without knowledge of the 1596 Ottoman tax registry, proposed a secondary site for Kefar Shiḥlayim as being "Sahlim near Ascalon," an indefinite site, but as a possible alternative to Iraq al-Manshiyya. Klein's view seems to be purely based on the assumption that "Sahlim near Ascalon" was a place other than Iraq al-Manshiyya.

Tell esh-Sheri'ah  
Albright, dissenting, thought that the same site was realized in Tell el-Huweilfeh, a ruin east of Dahiriyeh, or else in Tell el-Fârʿah, west of Beersheba. On the assumption that Shilḥim is a corruption of the name Sharuhen, as proposed by historical geographers, and that Shilḥim was the site of Kefar Shiḥlayim, this would point to a different locale. Kampffmeyer's view, however, is highly unlikely, as it is to assume that the old appellation was changed in the interim and returned back to a phonetic-sound nearest its earliest phonetic-sound.

Further reading 
 al-Ḥilou, Abdoullah 1986. Topographische Namen des syro-palästinische Raumes nach arabischen Geographen. Historische und etymologische Untersuchungen [Topographical names of the Syro-Palestinian region according to Arabic geographers. Historical and etymological studies], PhD thesis, Freie Universität Berlin, pp. 201–ff., s.v. Saḥlin (German)

See also 
 Tel Erani

References

Bibliography

, s.v. 

 
Josephus, The Jewish War (with an English translation by H. St. J. Thackeray), Loeb Classical Library

</ref>

 (Reprinted from the Proceedings of the American Academy for Jewish Research, vol. VII)

External links 

Survey of Western Palestine, Map 20:   IAA, Wikimedia commons
 Tel ʽErani, Hadashot Arkheologiyot, Excavations and Surveys in Israel (vol. 129: 2017), Israel Antiquities Authority (IAA)

Ancient villages in Israel
Former populated places in Israel
Tells (archaeology)
Archaeological sites in Israel
Ancient Jewish history
Judea (Roman province)
Historic Jewish communities
First Jewish–Roman War
Ancient Jewish settlements of Judaea
Bar Kokhba revolt
Geography of Palestine (region)
Geography of Israel
Kiryat Gat
Disputed Biblical places